Adamson University also referred to by its acronym AdU is a private, Catholic coeducational basic and higher education institution run by the Congregation of the Mission in Manila, Philippines. The university has academic programs in graduate school, law, the liberal arts, sciences, engineering, nursing, pharmacy, architecture, business administration, and education, as well as secondary, elementary, and preparatory education. Adamson University has eight courses listed as centers of development and centers of excellence by the Commission on Higher Education and has been granted Autonomous status.

Adamson University was included in the top 201+ universities in Asia in the Quacquarelli Symonds (QS) Asia University 2011 Rankings. This placed Adamson University as top nine in the rankings nationwide and top five in the Metro Manila area. In the 2021 edition of the QS University Rankings: Asia released on November 23, 2020, only 14 Philippine universities, including Adamson University, made it to the top-ranked list. Adamson has held a tight grip on the top rank when the university received a 651+ mark from QS in its 2022 edition.

Adamson University is also a member of the University Athletic Association of the Philippines and was awarded champion of the UAAP Season 80 Cheerdance competition.

History 
Dr. George Lucas Adamson, an Athens-born Greek chemist, founded the Adamson School of Industrial Chemistry (ASIC) on June 20, 1932, to train young men and women in the practical application of industrial chemistry. On February 19, 1936, a one-classroom school evolved into the Adamson School of Industrial Chemistry and Engineering (ASICE). Upon approval of its application for university status by the Secretary of Public Instruction on February 5, 1941, it became known as Adamson University (AdU).

Soon after, Lucas's cousin Alexander Athos Adamson arrived at ASIC to assist the budding school. Alexander joined the administration on July 15, 1932, serving as vice president, treasurer, and registrar. George Athos Adamson, Alexander's brother, joined the team in 1934 as the School Dean, Dean of the College of Engineering, and professor. In 1939, the wife of George Lucas, Evdoxia Savaides Adamson, began working and teaching at the university. She later served as Dean of the College of Education and the College of Liberal Arts and Sciences. After arriving in 1939, Sofia Adamson, wife of George Athos, taught in the College of Education and briefly served as the Junior Normal College's Director. On February 5, 1941, the school was granted university status by the Department of Education. On December 4, 1964, the university was turned over to the Vincentian Fathers of the Congregation of the Mission and was incorporated into the Adamson-Ozanam Education Institutions, Inc. Its patron saint is Saint Vincent de Paul. Then, all the Adamsons worked at the university except George Athos and Sofia, who left after the war. George Lucas Adamson was president of Adamson University for 35 years, including a three-year holdover period during the Vincentians' administration. Adamson University became a probationary member of the University Athletics Association of the Philippines in 1952. It became a regular member in 1971.

Fr. Leandro I. Montañana, C.M., a Spanish Vincentian, was the second President and the first C.M. president. He held this position until 1985 when he was succeeded by Fr. Rolando S. Dela Goza, C.M., the first Filipino university president, who served until 1994. Fr. Jimmy Belita, C.M., who served as president until 2003, was followed by the fifth president, Fr. Gregorio L. Bañaga, Jr., C.M.

Despite being most renowned for its chemical and engineering departments, Adamson progressively added courses in architecture, sciences, pharmacy, business, education, liberal arts, law, graduate school, basic education, and theology as it expanded. The transfer of ownership in 1964 transformed the university from a secular to a Catholic university by incorporating it under the Adamson-Ozanam Educational Institutions, Inc. St. Vincent de Paul, the founder of the Congregation of the Mission, was named the patron saint of the university, and the motto Veritas in Caritate (Truth in Charity) was adopted. A new vision was articulated, essentially that of providing affordable quality education, particularly for the socially disadvantaged — a vision not substantially different from that of the Founder, who desired to assist Filipinos in gaining a living by providing the most practical education in the shortest amount of time. The university responded to the problems and demands of the period by offering courses in information technology and systems, nursing, customs administration, hospitality management, and physical education.

Fr. Bañaga led Adamson University to several accomplishments in the twenty-first century. During its Diamond Jubilee celebration in 2007, the National Historical Commission of the Philippines designated the university as a historic site. A memorial was installed in front of the St. Vincent Building, the oldest building on campus, commemorating this heritage.

The Commission on Higher Education (CHED) after passing rigorous examinations and visits, the university was given Autonomous status and certification for Institutional Monitoring and Evaluation for Quality Assurance (IQuAME) in 2010 by the Commission on Higher Education (CHED). The Autonomous status signifies that Adamson University will have greater autonomy or independence in its administration, decision-making, and implementation; have the privilege to offer new programs and distance courses, among other things; and have the authority to grant an Honoris Causa to deserving individuals in accordance with CHED's regulations for awarding honorary degrees. Meanwhile, the IQuAME certification signifies that the university has satisfied and cooperated with the norms and standards established by CHED to determine the value of its education and services. Additionally, CHED has designated numerous degree programs as Centers of Excellence and/or Centers of Development.

On November 16, 2012, the Adamson University Museum-Wing Founders was inaugurated to commemorate the institution's 80th anniversary. The Founder's Wing contains memorabilia and personal items Dr. Adamson's family contributed. Mrs. Evdoxia Adamson, his widow, has meticulously kept the objects in the Founder's Wing, which were shipped from Spain, where the Adamson family currently resides.

Adamson University sought and received the coveted ISO 9001:2008 Management Systems certification from TÜV Rheinland in January 2013, bolstering its efforts to attain excellence. The ISO 9001:2008 certification indicates that the university's processes and standards are of international management system quality. The university has implemented quality assurance methodologies and maintenance procedures for academic and support services. By formalizing and maintaining its quality assurance systems, the university can assure its students, parents, and other customers that teaching quality will stay high and transactions will be conducted effectively.

In 2015, Fr. Marcelo V. Manimtim, C.M., became the sixth and current president of the university after Fr. Bañaga's administration.

Campus

Adamson University is located in San Marcelino Street, Ermita. The Technological University of the Philippines, Santa Isabel College Manila, Emilio Aguinaldo College, and Philippine Normal University are its nearest neighbors. Adamson University has eight buildings occupying 10.7 hectares of land.

The school was located in three different campuses {Santa Cruz (1932–1933), San Miguel (1933–1939), and Intramuros (1939-1941)} before finally settling on its present campus along San Marcelino Street in 1946. The university expanded its campus in San Marcelino by acquiring the Meralco building in 1968 and the St. Theresa's College-Manila site just across the street in 1977.

Alumni

Politics and governance
 Ruthlane Uy Asmundson, former mayor of Davis, California
 Cynthia Barker, Mayor of Hertsmere, a local government district and borough in Hertfordshire, England
 Eduardo del Rosario, Secretary of Department of Human Settlements and Urban Development
 Romulo Peña Jr., Representative of the First District of Makati
 Angelito Gatlabayan, former city mayor and representative of the 2nd District of Antipolo
 Jose Catindig Jr., former mayor or Santa Rosa, Laguna
 Roberto Uy, governor of Zamboanga del Norte
 Noel Rosal, former mayor of Legazpi, Albay

Sports
 Rafael "Paeng" Nepomuceno, World Champion bowler
 Carlos Yulo, 2019 World Artistic Gymnastics Championships gold medalist in floor exercise finals
 Kenneth Duremdes, basketball player, UNTV Cup Senate Defenders Head Coach,
 Marlou Aquino, basketball player
 Hector Calma, basketball player
 Louie Alas, Letran Knights coach
 Edward Joseph Feihl, basketball player
 Gherome Ejercito, basketball player
 Eddie Laure, basketball player
 Alex Nuyles, basketball player
 Lester Alvarez, basketball player
 Ken Bono, basketball player
 Chad Alonzo, basketball player
 Melvin Mamaclay, basketball player
 Jericho Cruz, basketball player
 Rodney Brondial, basketball player
 Eric Camson, basketball player
 Don Trollano. basketball player
 Jansen Rios, basketball player
 Sean Manganti, basketball player
 Jerrick Ahanmisi, basketball player
 Mylene Paat, Volleyball player, Philippine National Women's Volleyball Team Member
 Jema Galanza, Volleyball player, Creamline Cool Smashers
 Tatan Pantone, Volleyball player, PLDT Home Fibr Hitters
 Dante Alinsunurin, champion volleyball coach
 Sherwin Meneses, champion volleyball coach

Arts, culture, religion, and entertainment
 Prince Villanueva, actor
 Hazel Ann Mendoza, actress
 Nida Blanca, actress
 Francine Prieto, actress
 Jestoni Alarcon, actor
 Neil Coleta, actor
 Mario O'Hara, film director, film producer and screenwriter
 Guillermo Gómez Rivera, historian and writer
 Fernando Suarez, priest
 Florentino Floro, judge

Science and research
 Mary Jane Alvero, CEO of  Geoscience Testing Laboratory, United Arab Emirates

See also
Tinik Ng Teatro

References

External links

 Adamson University Official Website
 Adamson University Official Facebook Page

Universities
 
Catholic universities and colleges in Manila
Education in Ermita
Universities and colleges in Manila
University Athletic Association of the Philippines universities
Educational institutions established in 1932
1932 establishments in the Philippines